Surveykkallu is a 1976 Indian Malayalam film, directed by Thoppil Bhasi. The film stars KPAC Lalitha, Lakshmi, Manavalan Joseph and Mohan Sharma in the lead roles. The film has musical score by G. Devarajan.

Cast
 
Usharani 
Lakshmi 
Manavalan Joseph 
Mohan Sharma 
Sankaradi 
M. G. Soman

Soundtrack
The music was composed by G. Devarajan and the lyrics were written by ONV Kurup.

References

External links
 

1976 films
1970s Malayalam-language films